Fort Trois-Rivières was a 17th-century wooden fort in New France. It was built between 1634 and 1638 by the Sieur de Laviolette.

The construction of a wooden fort on this site marked the second permanent settlement in New France and the foundation of the modern city of Trois-Rivières, Quebec, Canada. It was recognized as a National Historic Site of Canada on January 30, 1920.

It was protected by a palisade that repelled a large Iroquois attack in 1653 and was in use until 1668. It was demolished following a peace treaty signed with the Iroquois in 1668.

It was strengthened by the governor of New France, Louis d'Ailleboust de Coulonge, at the end of 1650. He gave very specific instructions for a more effective defence from attacks to the site's commander, Pierre Boucher. It was "saved from complete destruction as a result of the investments of 1653, by five hundred Mohawks."

Commemorative plaque
A commemorative plaque is fixed to a large stone located south of the post office on des Casernes Street in what is today known as Platon Park. The perimeter of the fort is bounded by present-day streets of Saint-Pierre, Saint-Jean, Saint-Louis, des Casernes and Notre-Dame.

References

Buildings and structures in Trois-Rivières
Buildings and structures completed in 1638
Trois-Rivieres
Buildings and structures demolished in the 17th century
Trois-Rivieres
National Historic Sites in Quebec
Heritage sites in Mauricie
1638 establishments in New France
1668 disestablishments in New France